The New Zealand national cricket team toured Australia in the 2004–05 season and played 2 Test matches against Australia.

Test series
Australia won the Test series 2–0 with convincing wins in both matches.

Glenn McGrath was named man of the series after hitting his first half century in the First Test and took 9 wickets over the two matches.

1st Test

2nd Test

One Day Internationals
Australia and New Zealand played an ODI series which ended 1–1 with one game abandoned due to rain.  This was the inaugural Chappell–Hadlee Trophy.

New Zealand's victory at Melbourne was the first win by New Zealand against Australia in almost 3 years. The match at Brisbane was abandoned without a ball being bowled due to heavy rain, preventing the series decider from taking place.

1st ODI

2nd ODI

3rd ODI

For more information about the ODI competition, see : 2004–05 Chappell–Hadlee Trophy.

External sources
 CricketArchive
 New Zealand in Australia 2004

Notes

References
 Playfair Cricket Annual
 Wisden Cricketers Almanack

2004 in New Zealand cricket
2005 in New Zealand cricket
2004-05
2004–05 Australian cricket season
International cricket competitions in 2004–05
2004 in Australian cricket
2005 in Australian cricket